Urnisa is a genus of short-horned grasshoppers in the family Acrididae. There are at least three described species in Urnisa, found in Australia.

Species
These species belong to the genus Urnisa:
 Urnisa erythrocnemis (Stål, 1861) (Plain Urnisa)
 Urnisa guttulosa (Walker, 1870)
 Urnisa rugosa Saussure, 1884 (Red-legged Urnisa)

References

External links

 

Acrididae